This is an article compilation of seasons completed by the Seattle Seahawks American football franchise of the National Football League (NFL). This article compiles information of the season-by-season records of the Seahawks' franchise from 1976 to present, including postseason records, and league awards for individual players or head coaches. As of the end of the 2022 NFL season, the Seahawks have 26 winning seasons, 18 losing seasons, and four seasons where they finished 8–8. With a 35–6 Week 14 win over the Baltimore Ravens on December 13 during the 2015 season, not only did the Seahawks improved to 8–5 at that point in the season, but the Seahawks' all–time franchise regular-season win–loss record improved to 313–312–0; this marked the first time ever in team history that the Seahawks have had an overall winning regular season win–loss record (a win–loss record above .500). Since re-joining the National Football Conference in 2002, the Seahawks have compiled a record of 195–142–1 (as of the end of the 2022 season).  Also since then, the Seahawks have had only five losing seasons (between 2008 and 2011, as well as 2021), although their 2010 team won the Western division title, despite finishing with a 7–9 record.  Counting their inaugural 1976 season, where they finished 2–12, Seattle's overall record as an NFC franchise is 197–154–1, while finishing 166-204 during their time as a member of the AFC.

During their tenure in the American Football Conference, the Seahawks won the Western division twice (1988 and 1999), and made the AFC Championship game in 1983, their first-ever playoff season.  In twenty-five seasons as a member of the AFC West, Seattle made the playoffs five times, with the team's most successful period prior to re-joining the NFC was during the tenure of head coach Chuck Knox, during a nine-season period from 1983 to 1991.  Knox was responsible for four of the five playoff appearances that the Seahawks made during their time in the AFC, while in 1999, Seattle made the playoffs in Mike Holmgren's first season in charge, and it was the team's last AFC playoff appearance (a Wild Card playoff loss to the Miami Dolphins) before the transition to the NFC.  Seattle is the only active NFL franchise to appear in both of the AFC and NFC championship games, doing so in 1983 (AFC), 2005, 2013, and 2014 (NFC), winning the latter three.

The Seahawks are one of four North American men's professional sports teams that have played in Seattle with an all–time winning record, after the Seattle Metropolitans (the first American team to win the Stanley Cup in 1917, folded in 1924), the Seattle SuperSonics (who relocated to Oklahoma City and became the Thunder in the summer of 2008), and the Seattle Sounders FC (established in 2007 as an expansion franchise, currently active). Therefore, the Seahawks are currently one of two active North American men's professional sports teams located in Seattle with an overall winning record. On October 23, 2016, the Seahawks played the Arizona Cardinals at University of Phoenix Stadium to a 6–6 tie, the first ever tie in franchise history

Seasons

Footnotes

See also
History of the Seattle Seahawks

References

 
Seattle Seahawks
seasons